Curfew Breakers is a 1957 American film starring Paul Kelly and Cathy Downs. It was also known as Hooked and Narcotics Squad.

External links

Curfew Breakers at Letterbox DVD
Curefew Breakers at TCMDB

1957 films
American crime action films
1950s English-language films
Films scored by Paul Dunlap
1950s American films